Alive is a studio live album by Chick Corea, released in 1991 through the record label GRP. The album peaked at number three on Billboard Top Jazz Albums chart.

Track listing 

"On Green Dolphin Street" (Bronislaw Kaper, Ned Washington) – 9:14
"How Deep Is the Ocean?" (Irving Berlin) – 11:40
"Humpty Dumpty" (Chick Corea) – 8:51
"Sophisticated Lady" (Duke Ellington, Irving Mills, Mitchell Parish) – 6:59
"U.M.M.G. (Upper Manhattan Medical Group)" (Billy Strayhorn) – 5:29
"'Round Midnight" (Bernie Hanighen, Thelonious Monk, Cootie Williams) – 8:39
"Hackensack" (Thelonious Monk) – 2:41
"Morning Sprite" (Chick Corea) – 10:15

Personnel 
Musicians
 Chick Corea – piano
 John Patitucci – bass
 Dave Weckl – drums

Production
 Chick Corea – producer, engineer (mixing)
 Dave Grusin – executive producer
 Ron Moss – executive producer
 Larry Rosen – executive producer
 Bernie Kirsh – engineer (recording, mixing)
 Doug Sax – engineer (mastering)
 Robert Read – assistant engineer
 Evelyn Brechtlein – project coordination, management
 Joseph Doughney – post production
 Michael Landy – post production
 Michelle Lewis – production coordination
 David Gibb, Scott Johnson, Sonny Mediana, Andy Ruggirello, Dan Serrano – design
 Harrison Funk – photography

Chart performance

References 

1991 albums
Chick Corea albums
GRP Records albums